Samuel Earnshaw (1 February 1805, Sheffield, Yorkshire – 6 December 1888, Sheffield, Yorkshire) was an English clergyman and mathematician and physicist, noted for his contributions to theoretical physics, especially "Earnshaw's theorem".

Earnshaw was born in Sheffield and entered St John's College, Cambridge, graduating Senior Wrangler and Smith's Prizeman in 1831.

From 1831 to 1847 Earnshaw worked in Cambridge as tripos coach, and in 1846 was appointed to the parish church St. Michael, Cambridge. For a time he acted as curate to the Revd Charles Simeon.  In 1847 his health broke down and he returned to Sheffield working as a chaplain and teacher.

Earnshaw published several mathematical and physical articles and books.  His most famous contribution, "Earnshaw's theorem", shows the impossibility of stable levitating permanent magnets: other topics included optics, waves, dynamics and acoustics in physics, calculus, trigonometry and partial differential equations in mathematics. As a clergyman, he published several sermons and treatises.

See also
Cotes's spiral

References

External links
 Samuel Earnshaw

1805 births
1888 deaths
Alumni of St John's College, Cambridge
19th-century English mathematicians
Clergy from Sheffield
Senior Wranglers